The Singapore National Day Parade 2018, also known as NDP 2018, was a national parade and ceremony that was held on 9 August 2018 in commemoration of Singapore's 53rd year of independence. It located at The Float at Marina Bay. It is the first National Day Parade for President Halimah Yacob.

The NDP song is based on the 1987 NDP song, We Are Singapore, with an update by local singer Charlie Lim. It is also the 3rd time in history that an NDP song is reused the second time, following This is Home Truly (1998) and We Will Get There (2002) that were reused respectively in 2004 and 2014.

For the first time at the National Day parade, combat divers from the Republic of Singapore Navy will perform free-fall water jump alongside the Singapore Army's Red Lions. The Red Lions will jump at a record height of 3800m, the highest ever for an NDP and will be in wingsuits for the first time.

References

2018 in Singapore
Military parades in Singapore